Barry Clarke may refer to:

 Barry Clarke (bishop) (born 1952), Anglican bishop of Montreal
 Barry Clarke (engineer), president of the Institution of Civil Engineers
 Barry Clarke, member of English folk rock band Trees

See also 
 Barry Clark (disambiguation)